Oleśnica  is a town in Staszów County, Świętokrzyskie Voivodeship, in south-central Poland. It is the seat of the gmina (administrative district) called Gmina Oleśnica. The village has a population of  1,962, and used to be a town from 1470 to 1869.

During the reign of King Kazimierz Wielki, Oleśnica was the seat of a Roman Catholic parish, which covered the area of 49 square kilometers. The village furthermore served as main residence of the noble Oleśnicki family (later, it belonged to the Zborowski family and the Lubomirski family). The father of Cardinal Zbigniew Oleśnicki was born here.

Oleśnica received Magdeburg rights in the year 1470, and during the Polish Golden Age, it was a small town, with 12 artisans. Furthermore, since the mid-16th century, it was a local center of the Protestant Reformation, with a Calvinist prayer house, opened here in 1563 by Mikolaj Zborowski. The population of the town remained small – in 1673, it was only 184. Oleśnica was completely destroyed in the Great Northern War, and after the Partitions of Poland it briefly belonged to the Habsburg Empire, to be annexed in 1815 by the Russian-controlled Congress Poland, where it remained until 1915. Due to proximity of the tightly locked Austrian – Russian border, Oleśnica's development was halted, and finally, after the January Uprising, it lost the town charter.

Several notable people were born in or connected with Oleśnica. Among them were Dobieslaw Oleśnicki, the castellan of Wojnicz, Lublin and Sandomierz, the starosta of Krakow, who participated in the Battle of Grunwald and commanded the siege of the Malbork Castle in 1410, and Cardinal Zbigniew Olesnicki, the Bishop of Krakow in 1423–1455, as well as many members of the Zborowski family.

Demography 
According to the 2002 Poland census, there were 1,961 people residing in Oleśnica village, of whom 50.2% were male and 49.8% were female. In the village, the population was spread out, with 28.5% under the age of 18, 38.6% from 18 to 44, 17% from 45 to 64, and 16% who were 65 years of age or older.
 Figure 1. Population pyramid of village in 2002 — by age group and sex

References

Villages in Staszów County
Lesser Poland
Kielce Governorate
Kielce Voivodeship (1919–1939)